The following is a list of awards and nominations received by American actor and filmmaker Edward Norton.

Major associations

Academy Awards

BAFTA Awards

Primetime Emmy Awards

Daytime Emmy Awards

Golden Globe Awards

Screen Actors Guild Awards

Other awards and nominations

AACTA International Awards

Boston Society of Film Critics

Chicago Film Critics Association

Critics' Choice Movie Awards

Detroit Film Critics Society

Florida Film Critics Circle

Gotham Awards

Houston Film Critics Society

Independent Spirit Awards

London Film Critics' Circle

Los Angeles Film Critics Association

MTV Movie & TV Awards

National Board of Review

Online Film Critics Society

San Diego Film Critics Society

San Francisco Film Critics Circle

Satellite Awards

Saturn Awards

Society of Texas Film Critics

St. Louis Gateway Film Critics Association

Vancouver Film Critics Circle

Washington D.C. Area Film Critics Association

References

External links
 

Norton, Edward